Dryopteris hasseltii is a species of fern in the family Dryopteridaceae. It occurs from India, through southeast Asia, as far as north-east Queensland in Australia. Its natural habitat is subtropical or tropical moist lowland forests. It is threatened by habitat loss.

References

hasseltii
Ferns of Asia
Ferns of India
Flora of China
Flora of Malesia
Flora of New Guinea
Flora of Queensland
Nature Conservation Act rare biota
Endangered biota of Queensland
Endangered flora of Australia
Rare flora of Australia
Ferns of Australia
Taxonomy articles created by Polbot
Taxobox binomials not recognized by IUCN